Ranabir Sen (born 18 October 1945) is an Indian former cricketer. He played two first-class matches for Bengal between 1962 and 1972.

See also
 List of Bengal cricketers

References

External links
 

1945 births
Living people
Indian cricketers
Bengal cricketers
Cricketers from Kolkata